Flóra Bolonyai (born 5 April 1991 in Budapest) is a Hungarian water polo goalkeeper. At the 2012 Summer Olympics, she competed for the Hungary women's national water polo team in the women's event.

In 2013, she won the NCAA Women's Water Polo Championship with USC Trojans.

See also
 Hungary women's Olympic water polo team records and statistics
 List of women's Olympic water polo tournament goalkeepers
 List of World Aquatics Championships medalists in water polo

References

External links
 

1991 births
Living people
Hungarian female water polo players
Water polo goalkeepers
Olympic water polo players of Hungary
Water polo players at the 2012 Summer Olympics
World Aquatics Championships medalists in water polo
Universiade medalists in water polo
Universiade silver medalists for Hungary
Medalists at the 2017 Summer Universiade
Water polo players from Budapest
21st-century Hungarian women